Pulaski Historic Commercial District is a national historic district located at Pulaski, Pulaski County, Virginia. It encompasses 78 contributing buildings and 1 contributing site in the central business district of the town of Pulaski.  It includes a variety of governmental, commercial, industrial, and institutional buildings dated primarily to the late-19th and early-20th century.  Notable buildings include the MaGill building, B. D. Smith and Bros., building, Elks Theatre and building (c. 1911), former high school (c. 1913-1920), freight depot (1907), Pulaski Grocery Company building, the General Chemical Company, Christ Episcopal Church (1908), and the Appalachian Power Company building (c. 1940).  The Dalton Theatre Building and Pulaski County Courthouse are located in the district and listed separately.

It was added to the National Register of Historic Places in 1986.

References

Historic districts in Pulaski County, Virginia
Colonial Revival architecture in Virginia
Neoclassical architecture in Virginia
Tudor Revival architecture in Virginia
National Register of Historic Places in Pulaski County, Virginia
Historic districts on the National Register of Historic Places in Virginia